The 2016 Football Federation Victoria season was the third season under the new competition format for state-level football (soccer) in Victoria.  The competition consisted of seven divisions across the state of Victoria.

League Tables

2016 National Premier Leagues Victoria

The 2016 National Premier Leagues Victoria season was played over 26 rounds. The overall premier of this division qualified for the 2016 National Premier Leagues finals series, and competed with the other state federation champions in a final knockout tournament to decide the National Premier Leagues champion for 2016.

Finals

Promotion/relegation play-off

2016 National Premier Leagues Victoria 2

West

The 2016 National Premier Leagues Victoria 2 West was played over 28 rounds, with each team playing the teams in their conference twice and the other conference once. The top team at the end of the season was promoted to National Premier Leagues Victoria, and the second placed team entered the promotion play-off.

East

The 2015 National Premier Leagues Victoria 2 East was played over 28 rounds, with each team playing the teams in their conference twice and the other conference once. The top team at the end of the season was promoted to National Premier Leagues Victoria, and the second placed team entered the promotion play-off.

Grand Final

The NPL2 Season concluded with a single match between the winners of the leagues in the West and East sections, to determine the NPL2 Champion.

2016 Victoria State League 1

North-West

South-East

2016 Victoria State League 2

North-West

South-East

2016 Victoria State League 3

North-West

South-East

Promotion/relegation play-off

2016 Women's National Premier League 

The highest tier domestic football competition in Victoria for women is known for sponsorship reasons as the PS4 Women's National Premier League.   This was the inaugural season of the NPL Women's format, replacing the previous Women's Premier League format. Only 8 of the 22 applicants were granted licences for the 2016 season, plus the Victorian women's team of the NTC. The 9 teams played a 24-round league competition.

Finals

Cup Competitions

2016 Dockerty Cup

Football Victoria soccer clubs competed in 2016 for the Dockerty Cup. The tournament doubled as the Victorian qualifiers for the 2016 FFA Cup, with the top four clubs progressing to the Round of 32. A total of 202 clubs entered the qualifying phase, with the clubs entering in a staggered format.

The Cup was won by Bentleigh Greens.

In addition to the two A-League clubs (Melbourne Victory and Melbourne City), the four semi-finalists (Bentleigh Greens, Green Gully, Hume City and Melbourne Knights) competed in the final rounds of the 2016 FFA Cup.

References

Football Federation Victoria
Soccer in Victoria (Australia)